The National People's Congress Supervisory and Judicial Affairs Committee is one of ten special committees of the National People's Congress, the national legislature of the People's Republic of China. The special committee was created during the first session of the 7th National People's Congress in March 1988, and has existed for every National People's Congress since.

The committee is formerly known as the National People's Congress Internal and Judicial Affairs Committee. Since 2018, it was renamed as the National People's Congress Supervisory and Judicial Affairs Committee.

Chairpersons

References

Supervisory and Judicial Affairs Committee
Parliamentary committees on Justice